Admiral George Holmes Borrett, CB (10 March 1868 – 10 June 1952) was an officer of the Royal Navy. He served during the First World War, commanding a battleship at the Battle of Jutland, and later rising to the rank of admiral.

Early life 
George Borrett was born on 10 March 1868 in Wimbledon to G. Borrett. He joined the competitive examinations for cadetships in the Royal Navy on 15 July 1889 and he was one of the best of the class, making him a Naval Cadet. He later married Clare Louisa daughter of William Guyer Hunter and had one daughter named Ellen.

Naval career 
Borrrett was promoted to Sub-Lieutenant on 13 November 1887, and again on 13 November 1889, to Lieutenant. He was promoted to Commander on 1 January 1901 for services in China, and in June the following year was posted to the signals school at HMS Victory. He served at Victory during the coronation fleet review on 16 August 1902. From 1 September 1902 he was posted to the pre-dreadnought battleship HMS Revenge, which became flagship of the Home Fleet the following month. While in command of HMS Pioneer, he was promoted to Captain on 31 December 1906. Borrett served during the First World War, commanding the battleship HMS Monarch at the Battle of Jutland in 1916. For his actions during the war, he was appointed a Companion of the Order of the Bath (CB) on 1 January 1918. He would finally become Rear-Admiral on 16 August 1918 and Vice-Admiral on 14 October 1923, before retiring after achieving the rank of Admiral on 1 August 1927.

Later life 
After the war, Borrett stayed in the Navy and received further promotions. On 17 February 1925 he was placed at his own request on the retired list, though he remained in the navy until 1927. When he was finally promoted to Admiral on 1 August 1927, he fully retired from naval service.

He died on 10 June 1952 at the age of 84, after a career of 46 years in the Navy.

Ships commanded 

{{succession box
| title = Captain of [[HMS Ramillies (1892)|HMS Ramillies]]
| years = 18 April 1910 – 24 February 1911
| before = Arthur W. Ewart
| after = ?
}}

 Bibliography 

"Admiral G. H. Borrett" (Obituaries).  The Times''.  Wednesday, 11 June 1952.  Issue 52335, col D, p. 8.

Footnotes 

1868 births
1952 deaths
Royal Navy admirals
Royal Navy admirals of World War I
English admirals
Battle of Jutland
Companions of the Order of the Bath
People from Wimbledon, London